Convolvulus verecundus, commonly known as trailing bindweed or tussock bindweed, is a species of low-growing flowering plant in the family Convolvulaceae. Endemic to New Zealand, it was formally described as a new species by botanist Harry Allan in his 1961 work Flora of New Zealand.

The plant occurs on the South Island of New Zealand, from the Clarence River extending south to Central Otago. Flowering occurs from November through January, and the flowers are variably white, pink, and red. Similar species include Convolvulus waitaha and C. fracto-saxosa.

References

verecundus
Endemic flora of New Zealand
Plants described in 1961
Taxa named by Harry Allan